Rossoshansky District  is an administrative and municipal district (raion), one of the thirty-two in Voronezh Oblast, Russia. It is located in the southwest of the oblast. Its administrative center is the town of Rossosh. Population:  The population of Rossosh accounts for 68.5% of the district's total population.

References

Notes

Sources

Districts of Voronezh Oblast